Jérôme Samson (born September 4, 1987) is a Canadian former professional ice hockey winger. He played in the National Hockey League (NHL) with the Carolina Hurricanes.

Playing career
Undrafted, Samson was signed by the Carolina Hurricanes on July 2, 2007. During the 2009–10 season, Samson made his NHL debut with the Hurricanes and assisted on a Rod Brind'Amour goal on his first shift against the Nashville Predators on January 7, 2010.

He scored his first NHL goal on January 10, 2012 against Sergei Bobrovsky of the Philadelphia Flyers.

On July 5, 2013, Samson left the Hurricanes organization as a free agent and signed a one-year contract with the Winnipeg Jets. In his single season in 2013–14 within the Jets organization, Samson was assigned to AHL affiliate, the St. John's IceCaps.

On July 10, 2014, Samson agreed to a one-year, two-way contract with the Tampa Bay Lightning. During the 2014–15 season, on January 6, 2015, he was released from his contract to join EHC Biel of the Swiss National League A. Samson recorded 1 goal and 7 assists in 26 games with the Syracuse Crunch, a major performance drop form the 27 goal, 29 assist season he had in the 2013–14 AHL season.

On June 2, 2015, Samson continued in Europe to sign a one-year contract in Germany with EHC München of the Deutsche Eishockey Liga (DEL). He captured the German championship with the München team in 2016 and left the club afterwards, signing a deal with fellow DEL team Schwenninger Wild Wings in July 2016. In the 2016–17 season, Samson played amongst the top two scoring lines with the Wild Wings, besting his previous year with 13 goals and 24 points in 51 games. On March 3, 2017, it was announced that Samson would leave the club as a free agent.

On May 5, 2017, Samson signed as a free agent with the Vienna Capitals of the Austrian Hockey League (EBEL) for the 2017–18 season. The contract was cancelled in November 2017 after he suffered a concussion during a game against KAC on 15 October.

Career statistics

References

External links

1987 births
Living people
Albany River Rats players
EHC Biel players
Canadian ice hockey right wingers
Carolina Hurricanes players
Charlotte Checkers (2010–) players
Ice hockey people from Quebec
Moncton Wildcats players
EHC München players
Quebec Amateur Athletic Association players
St. John's IceCaps players
Schwenninger Wild Wings players
Sportspeople from Longueuil
Syracuse Crunch players
Undrafted National Hockey League players
Val-d'Or Foreurs players
Vienna Capitals players
Canadian expatriate ice hockey players in Austria
Canadian expatriate ice hockey players in Germany
Canadian expatriate ice hockey players in Switzerland